Thomas Thorne Hetherington (August 10, 1815 – September 3, 1913) was a merchant, farmer and political figure in New Brunswick, Canada. He represented Queen's County in the Legislative Assembly of New Brunswick from 1882 to 1892 as a Liberal member.

He was born in Johnston, Queen's County, New Brunswick, the son of Richard Hetherington, who came from England. In 1860, he married Violet D. Thorne. Hetherington was a justice of the peace and a commissioner in the Parish Court. He was reelected in Queen's in 1892 but resigned his seat to allow Andrew George Blair to be elected there in a by-election.

His son Judson also served as a member of the provincial assembly, also serving as speaker. He died in 1913.

References 

The Canadian parliamentary companion, 1889 JA Gemmill

New Brunswick Liberal Association MLAs
1815 births
1913 deaths
Canadian justices of the peace